Zillow Group, Inc., or simply Zillow, is an American tech real-estate marketplace company that was founded in 2006, and was created by Rich Barton and Lloyd Frink, former Microsoft executives and founders of Microsoft spin-off Expedia; Spencer Rascoff, a co-founder of Hotwire.com; David Beitel, Zillow's current chief technology officer; and Kristin Acker, Zillow's current senior vice president of experience design.

Barton is the current CEO of Zillow, Inc.

Business model
Zillow has stated that it is a media company that generates revenue by selling advertising on its website. In April 2009, Zillow announced a partnership to lend its real-estate search engine to the websites of more than 180 United States newspapers as a part of the Zillow Newspaper Consortium. Zillow shares advertising revenue from the co-branded sites with the newspapers and extends its reach into local markets.

In February 2011, Zillow and Yahoo! Real Estate launched an exclusive partnership creating the largest real-estate advertising network on the web, according to comScore Media Metrix.

Zillow now allows renters to pay rent online to their landlords for properties on the Zillow Rental Manager tool. Zillow charges renters a transaction fee when using debit or credit cards to pay their landlord. However, renters also have a no-fee option to pay their rent by using ACH.

In 2018, Zillow Group began operations as a blanket referral-fee network without an upfront cost called Zillow Flex. Once brokers close a home transaction with a client, they pay a referral fee out of escrow to Zillow. In areas where Flex partner brokers operate alongside brokers who pay for Zillow Premier Agent upfront, leads and connections flow through the same system and are allocated randomly to partner brokers. Blanket referral fees paid to Zillow Group are not disclosed to consumers, but likely range between 30 and 40% of the entire broker's commission. The main qualification for real-estate brokers who participate with Zillow Flex Program is their willingness to pay a blanket referral fee once the transaction is complete.

History 
Barton got the inspiration for funding Zillow when he was working at Microsoft and he realized that the real-estate industry would be transformed.  In December 2004, Zillow was incorporated; Zillow's website was launched in February 2006. In 2010, Spencer Rascoff was named CEO of the company. Barton stayed as executive chairman. In April 2018, Zillow entered the on-demand home-buying market with Zillow Offers. In February 2019, Barton returned as CEO to lead the transition.

In 2018, Zillow signed a partnership with Century 21 Canada to begin listing Canadian properties on the site, marking the first country outside the United States to be covered by the company.

In February 2020, Zillow's stock was up 18% after going down for four years. In March of the same year, the CEO of Zillow announced a cut in expenses by 25%, and stopped hiring due to the COVID-19 pandemic.  In March 2021, Zillow announced plans to increase the workforce by 40% by hiring more than 2,000 employees nationwide by the end of 2021. 

Zillow began purchasing homes in 2018/2019 with the goal of becoming a market maker with a per-unit target of within +/− 200 basis points (+/− 2%) of breakeven.  In November 2021, Zillow CEO Rich Barton announced the company would shutter the i-buying part of the business, sell its existing inventory, and lay off 25% of its employees. When Barton announced the company would cease purchasing homes, Zillow owned about 7,000 houses. The division responsible for acquiring and selling homes, Zillow Offers, resulted in the company losing $420 million in the third quarter of 2021.

Acquisitions
 In April 2011, Zillow acquired Postlets, an online real-estate listing creation and distribution platform. Terms of the deal were not disclosed publicly.
 In November 2011, Zillow acquired Diverse Solutions for $7.8 million.
 In May 2012, Zillow acquired RentJuice, a software-as-a-service company that allows landlords and property managers to market and lease their rental properties through a set of online tools. RentJuice was acquired for $40 million.
 On October 31, 2012, Zillow acquired real-estate shopping and collaboration platform Buyfolio.
 On November 5, 2012, Zillow acquired Lincoln, Nebraska-based mortgage-technology company Mortech for $17 million.
 On November 26, 2012, Zillow acquired HotPads for $16 million. HotPads, founded in 2005, lists real estate and rental listings on a map-based web interface.
 On August 19, 2013, Zillow acquired StreetEasy for $50 million.
 On July 16, 2014, Zillow acquired Retsly, a Vancouver, B.C.-based startup that helps developers access real-estate data from multiple listing services (MLS).
 On July 28, 2014, Zillow announced a deal to buy Trulia for $3.5 billion.
 On February 17, 2015, Zillow announced the completion of its acquisition of Trulia and the formation of the Zillow Group brand portfolio.
 On July 22, 2015, Zillow Group announced it would acquire Dotloop for $108 million.
 On January 3, 2016, Zillow Group announced it would acquire Naked Apartments for $13 million.
 On August 2, 2016, Zillow Group acquired Bridge Interactive.
 On September 8, 2017, Zillow Group acquired New Home Feed.
 On November 1, 2018,  Zillow Group acquired Overland Park, Kansas based national mortgage lender, Mortgage Lenders of America.
 In February 2021, Zillow announced that it had entered into an agreement to purchase ShowingTime, which itself had earlier acquired Showing Suite for $500 million.

Website features

Zillow has data on roughly 110 million homes across the United States. The company offers several features, including value estimates of homes, value changes of each home in a given time frame, aerial views of homes, and prices of comparable homes in the area. It also provides basic information on a given home, such as square footage and the number of bedrooms and bathrooms. Users can also get estimates of homes that have undergone significant changes, such as a remodeled kitchen.

In December 2006, Zillow launched features allowing users to post homes for sale and set a "Make Me Move" price (an informal way to market a home), as well as a real estate wiki. That same year, Zillow teamed with Microsoft to offer a feature in Microsoft Virtual Earth that shows aerial photographs.

In December 2009, Zillow expanded its listings to include rental homes.

In late 2013, Zillow began powering AOL Real Estate. In July 2014, Zillow also took over the real-estate portal for MSN Real Estate. In October 2017, Zillow announced to add three-dimensional tours to get 360° photos of houses customers are interested in buying or renting.

In July 2018, Zillow released a tool for prospective renters to submit a credit check and eviction history report to landlords.

The company reportedly had 36 million unique visitors in January 2019.

Zillow Mortgage Marketplace
On April 3, 2008, Zillow launched a service called Zillow Mortgage Marketplace. This service allows for borrowers to get custom loan quotes without revealing personally identifying information.

Zillow Mobile
Zillow Mobile apps allow users to view nearby homes based on the user's location.
 April 29, 2009 – iPhone application
 March 18, 2010 – Android application
 April 2, 2010 – iPad application
 March 31, 2011 – Blackberry application
 July 13, 2012 – Windows Phone application 
 November 27, 2013 – Windows 8.1 application
 November 2015 – Apple TV application

Zillow Advice
On December 16, 2008, Zillow launched Zillow Advice, allowing people to ask real-estate questions online and get answers from the website's community of experts.

Real-estate market reports
Zillow produces home value reports for the nation and over 130 metropolitan statistical areas. The reports identify market trends, including 5- and 10-year annualized change, negative equity,  short sales, and foreclosure transactions.

Zillow also releases a Homeowner Confidence Survey. The survey is conducted by Harris Interactive and measures homeowners' perceptions about home-value changes of their own home and the local market.

Neighborhood boundary maps (GIS data)
The Zillow data team has created a database of nearly 7,544 neighborhood boundaries in the largest cities in the U.S. and made them available via Creative Commons Attribute-Sharealike license.

Zestimate
Zillow determines an estimate, also known as a "Zestimate", for a home based on a range of publicly available information, including sales of comparable houses in a neighborhood. According to Zillow, the Zestimate is a starting point in determining a home's value. The accuracy of the Zestimate varies by location depending on how much information is publicly available, but Zillow allows users to check the accuracy of Zestimates in their own region against actual sales.

In March 2011, Zillow released Rent Zestimates, which provide estimated rent prices for 90 million homes.

On June 14, 2011, Zillow changed its algorithm used to calculate Zestimates. In addition to changing the current Zestimate for millions of homes throughout the country, Zillow changed historical Zestimate value information dating back to 2006.

On June 15, 2021 Zillow reported that it updated how it calculates the Zestimate for off-market homes, so to be more responsive to local trends and seasonality that may affect a home’s market value and includes even more historical data to improve accuracy.

Critique of Zestimate accuracy
In 2007, The Wall Street Journal studied the accuracy of Zillow's estimates and found that they "often are very good, frequently within a few percentage points of the actual price paid. But when Zillow is bad, it can be terrible."

In October 2006, the National Community Reinvestment Coalition filed a complaint with the Federal Trade Commission stating that Zillow was "intentionally misleading consumers and real-estate professionals to rely upon the accuracy of its valuation services despite the full knowledge of the company officials that their valuation Automated Valuation Model (AVM) mechanism is highly inaccurate and misleading." In a letter dated May 4, 2007, the FTC elected not to investigate this complaint, which was later withdrawn by the NCRC.

Using data published on the Zillow website, the typical Zestimate error in the United States in July 2016 was $14,000.

Controversy and lawsuits
While factors contributing to estimates are described elsewhere, Zillow seemingly overemphasises home square footage as the major metric driving property valuation. This method may not be unique to Zillow, but unduly distorts value expectations. Listings in areas where land is priced at high premiums often reflect an identical Zillow estimate to that of nearby homes with comparable interior square footage, but where the home might be decades older. Condition, age of home, special features, and proximity to nuisances are insufficiently factored into the estimate. Zillow has made some effort to add balance by including option for owners to provide their own value estimate, but these figures can be similarly unreliable as being opinion instead of quantifiable.

In 2014, Zillow faced several lawsuits from former employees at the Zillow operation in Irvine, California, alleging violations of California Labor Code and California Business and Professions Code. On February 26, 2016, the U.S. District Court for the Central District of California certified the class to include anyone who worked as an inside sales consultant at Zillow between November 2010 and January 2015. Among the numerous allegations brought by high-profile attorneys Bobby Samini and Mark Geragos, Zillow is accused of failing to pay wages, failing to pay overtime pay, and failing to provide meal and rest breaks. Zillow responded: "the narrative being pushed by this law firm through their multiple lawsuits is completely inconsistent with those who know and work with Zillow...the behavior described does not accurately depict our culture or the 1,200 Zillow employees."

In addition, Samini and Geragos represented a former Zillow employee in a sexual harassment action against the company, alleging "sexual torture" and "the most heinous acts of sexual harassment imaginable". According to the lawsuit, Zillow's Southern California office represents an "adult frat house where sexual harassment and misconduct are normalized, condoned, and promoted by male managers." Based on the allegations against the company, Samini has called Zillow a "modern day Animal House." On May 5, 2016, Zillow settled the action for an undisclosed amount, without admitting any wrongdoing.

In 2017, Zillow sent a cease-and-desist letter to Kate Wagner, the author of McMansion Hell, a blog that lampooned the presentations of luxury homes found on the site. Wagner was represented by the Electronic Frontier Foundation. Zillow later released a statement saying it had "decided against moving forward with legal action" on the matter.

References

External links
 

Companies based in Seattle
Online real estate databases
Real estate valuation
American companies established in 2004
Real estate companies established in 2004
Internet properties established in 2006
Companies listed on the Nasdaq
2004 establishments in Washington (state)
2011 initial public offerings
American real estate websites